Charles Barthélemy (Paris, 1825 – 1888) was a 19th-century French historian and archaeologist.

Publications 
(select list)
1854: Histoire de la Bretagne ancienne et moderne 
1854: Rational ou manuel des divins offices, ou, Raisons mystiques et historiques de la liturgie catholique, a translation of a work by Guillaume Durand.
1856: Histoire de la Russie, depuis les temps les plus reculés jusqu'à nos jours
1859: Histoire de la Turquie
Histoire de la Normandie ancienne et moderne
1862–1883: Erreurs et mensonges historiques  - 18 volumes.
1882: La comédie de Dancourt 
1884: La guerre de 1870-71 
1885: le consulat et l'Empire
1886: Histoire de la comédie en France des origines à nos jours 
1886: Les quarante fauteuils de l'Académie française, 1634-1886 
Les Confessions de Freron (1719-1776): Sa Vie, Souvenirs Intimes et Anecdotiques, ses Pensées

More complete list of his works in Dictionnaire international des écrivains du jour, De Gubernatis, 1888

External links 
 Charles Barthélémy on data.bnf.fr
 

1825 births
Writers from Paris
1888 deaths
19th-century French historians
French archaeologists
Latin–French translators
19th-century translators